The Meessiinae are a subfamily of moth of the family Tineidae.

Genera

 Afrocelestis
 Agnathosia
 Agoraula
 Augolychna
 Bathroxena
 Clinograptis
 Diachorisia
 Doleromorphia
 Drimylastis
 Emblematodes
 Epactris
 Eudarcia
 Galachrysis
 Homosetia
 Homostinea
 Hybroma
 Infurcitinea
 Ischnoscia
 Isocorypha
 Leucomele
 Lichenotinea
 Matratinea
 Mea
 Meneessia
 Montetinea
 Nannotinea
 Novotinea
 Oenoe
 Oxylychna
 Pompostolella
 Protodarcia
 Stenoptinea
 Tenaga
 Trissochyta
 Unilepidotricha
 Xeringinia

References